Lord of Sonseca is a hereditary title in the Peerage of Spain, granted in 1650 by Philip IV to Duarte Fernández de Acosta.

Lords of Sonseca (1650)
Duarte Fernández de Acosta, 1st Lord of Sonseca
Luis Beltrán de Lis y Espinosa de los Monteros, 2nd Lord of Sonseca
Santiago García y Beltrán de Lis, 3rd Lord of Sonseca
Santiago García y Janini, 4th Lord of Sonseca
Santiago García y Boscá, 5th Lord of Sonseca

See also
List of lords in the peerage of Spain

References

Lords of Spain
Lists of Spanish nobility